VCBI can mean:

 Bandaranaike International Airport near Colombo, Sri Lanka
 Véhicule Blindé de Combat d'Infanterie (VBCI, "Armoured vehicle for infantry combat")